The RPG-6 (Russian Ruchnaya Protivotankovaya Granata, "Handheld Anti-Tank Grenade") was a Soviet-era anti-tank hand grenade used during the late World War II and early Cold War period. It was superseded by the RKG-3 anti-tank grenade.

History
The RPG-6 was designed as a replacement for the RPG-43 after the Battle of Kursk.

It underwent testing in September 1943, and was accepted into service in October 1943. First RPG-6 grenades were used against Axis troops in last week of October 1943.

The weapon was a success and went into mass production in late 1943. During the war, RPG-6 grenades being used alongside the RPG-43.

In the USSR, some grenades were kept in storage even after the end of the World War II.

Design 
It operated on the shaped charge Munroe effect principle, in which a metal-lined cone-shaped explosive charge would generate a focused jet of hot metal that could penetrate armor-plate.

It was a conical casing enclosing a shaped charge and containing 562 grams of trinitrotoluene (TNT), fitted with a percussion fuse and four cloth ribbons to provide stability in flight after throwing.  It could penetrate approximately 100 millimeters of armour. The RPG-6 had a fragmentation radius of 20 metres from the point of detonation, and proved useful against infantry and tanks.

The RPG-43 had a large warhead, but was designed to detonate in contact with a tank's armour; it was later found that optimal performance was gained from a high-explosive anti-tank (HEAT) warhead if it exploded a short distance from the armour, roughly the same distance as the weapon's diameter. In the RPG-6 this was achieved by adding a hollow pointed nose section with an impact fuse in it, so that when the weapon detonated the warhead was at an optimum distance from the armour.

References

Hand grenades of the Soviet Union
Anti-tank grenades
World War II infantry weapons of the Soviet Union
Weapons and ammunition introduced in 1943